Trobbiani is an Italian surname. Notable people with the surname include:

Marcelo Trobbiani (born 1955), Argentine footballer and manager
Matt Trobbiani, Australian video game developer
Pablo Trobbiani (born 1976), Argentine footballer and manager

Italian-language surnames